These are the results of the women's singles competition in badminton at the 2011 Southeast Asian Games in Jakarta.

Medalists

Draw

References 
Results

Badminton at the 2011 Southeast Asian Games
South